The following is a partial list of secondary schools in Ukraine.

Crimea
 Simferopol gymnasium №1 (est. 1812)
 Gymnasium 9 (Simferopol) (est. 1917)
 School of the Future (Yalta) (est. 1971)

Vinnytsia Oblast

Volyn Oblast

 Lutsk Gymnasium 21 (est. 1986)

Dnipropetrovsk Oblast

Donetsk Oblast

Zhytomyr Oblast

Zakarpattia Oblast 
 Uzhhorod Gymnasium

Zaporizhzhia Oblast

Ivano-Frankivsk Oblast

Kyiv
 European Collegium Private School (est. 2002)
 Kyiv Christian Academy (est. 1993)
 Kyiv International School (est. 1992)
 Kyiv Natural Science Lyceum No. 145 (est. 1962)
 Kyiv Secondary School No. 189 (est. 1967)
 Kyiv Specialized School No. 98 (est. 1966)
 Kyiv Specialized School No. 159 (est. 1975)
 Meridian International School, Kyiv (est. 2001)
 Pechersk School International (est. 1995)
 Ukrainian Physics and Mathematics Lyceum (est. 1963)
 Ukrainian medical Lyceum (est. 1991)
 Kyiv National University of Trade and Economics (est. 1946)
 Lycée Français Anne de Kiev (est. 1994)
 Deutsche Schule Kiew
 Language Arts & Education-language school

Kyiv Oblast

Sevastopol

Kirovohrad Oblast

Luhansk Oblast

Lviv Oblast
 Lviv Physics and Mathematics Lyceum
 Lviv Secondary School No. 50

Mykolaiv Oblast

Odesa Oblast 
 Bolhrad Gymnasium
 Fontanka School
 Odesa Secondary School No. 121

Poltava Oblast

Rivne Oblast
 Ukrainian Gymnasium (Rivne)

Sumy Oblast

Ternopil Oblast

Kharkiv Oblast
Lozova Gymnasium

Kherson Oblast

Khmelnytskyi Oblast

Cherkasy Oblast

Chernivtsi Oblast

Chernihiv Oblast

Ukraine
Ukraine

Schools
Schools
Schools